Dipodium pulchellum is an almost leafless orchid that is endemic to north-east New South Wales and south-east Queensland in Australia.

Description 
Dipodium pulchellum is a tuberous, perennial, mycoheterotrophic herb and for most of the year, plants are dormant and have no above-ground presence. The sepals and petals are flat and almost straight, unlike those of D. punctatum which are cupped and often slightly curved backwards.

Taxonomy
Dipodium pulchellum was formally described in 1987 by Australian botanists  David Jones and Mark Clements from a specimen collected in the Tallebudgera Range in Queensland. The description was published in Proceedings of the Royal Society of Queensland. The specific epithet (pulchellum) is the diminutive form of the Latin word pulcher meaning "pretty", hence "pretty little".

Distribution and habitat
This orchid occurs in south-east Queensland and north-east New South Wales near Wardell, Grevillia and Tia Falls.

Ecology
Pollination of this species, as for all species in the genus, is by native bees and wasps.

Cultivation
No leafless species of Dipodium has been sustained in cultivation due to the inability to replicate its association with mycorrhizal fungi in a horticultural context.

References

pulchellum
Endemic orchids of Australia
Orchids of New South Wales
Orchids of Queensland
Plants described in 1987
Taxa named by David L. Jones (botanist)